The Lazurit Central Design Bureau is a company based in Nizhny Novgorod, Russia. It is part of the United Shipbuilding Corporation.

The Lazurit Central Design Bureau is a leading design firm in the field of submarines and submersible technology. "Lazurit" is the Russian word for lazurite.

Products
 Romeo-class submarine
 Charlie-class submarine
 Sierra-class submarine
 Priz-class deep-submergence rescue vehicle
 Russian deep submergence rescue vehicle AS-28

References

External links
 Official website

Shipbuilding companies of Russia
Companies based in Nizhny Novgorod
Russian brands
Shipbuilding companies of the Soviet Union
Ministry of the Shipbuilding Industry (Soviet Union)
Defence companies of the Soviet Union
Design bureaus